Entrerrios is a municipality in the Colombian subregion of Northern Antioquia, in the department of Antioquia. Its population according to the 2002 Census was 8,305 inhabitants.

References

Municipalities of Antioquia Department